Laktionov  may refer to:

Aleksandr Ivanovich Laktionov, acclaimed Socialist realism painter in the post-war Soviet Union.
Aleksandr Laktionov (footballer), Russian football player.
Denis Laktionov, Russian football player.
Serhiy Laktionov, Ukrainian football player and manager.
Laktionov Island, sub-Antarctic island.